Cho Mok-hee (born 5 November 1993) is a South Korean judoka.

She is the bronze medallist of the 2021 Asian-Pacific Judo Championships in the -63 kg category.

References

External links
 

1993 births
Living people
South Korean female judoka
21st-century South Korean women